WACZ may refer to:

 WZON, a radio station (620 AM) licensed to Bangor, Maine, which held the call sign WACZ from 1981 to 1983
 WDNY-FM, a radio station (93.9 FM) licensed to Dansville, New York, which held the call sign WACZ from 1990 to 1992